The 1985 Montreal Concordes season, saw the team finish in 2nd place in the East Division with an 8–8 record and lose in the East Final to the Hamilton Tiger-Cats 50–26. This season marked the team's only playoff win under the Montreal Concordes banner.

Preseason

Regular season

Standings

Schedule

Postseason

References

External links
Official Site

Montreal Alouettes seasons
1985 Canadian Football League season by team
1980s in Montreal
1985 in Quebec